Koca Dervish Mehmed Pasha (and Bıyıklı Koca Derviş Mehmed Paşa) was an Ottoman military officer and statesman from Circassia.

He was made Kapudan Pasha (Grand Admiral) in 1652 and promoted to Grand Vizier on 21 March 1653. He held the position until 28 October 1654.

See also
 List of Ottoman Grand Viziers
 List of Kapudan Pashas

References

17th-century Grand Viziers of the Ottoman Empire
Kapudan Pashas
People from the Ottoman Empire of Circassian descent
Ottoman military officers